Yakty-Kul (Yaqtıkül) is a rural locality (a village) in Araslanovsky Selsoviet, Meleuzovsky District, Bashkortostan, Russia. The population was 89 as of 2010. There is 1 street.

Geography 
Yakty-Kul is located 19 km northeast of Meleuz (the district's administrative centre) by road. Yangi-Aul is the nearest rural locality.

References 

Rural localities in Meleuzovsky District